is a Japanese manufacturer and distributor of hair care, skin care, perfumes, and deodorants. The company was founded in 1927 under the name  and changed its name to Tancho Corporation in 1959, and Mandom Corporation in 1971.

History
In 1927, Shinpachiro Nishimura founded the Kintsuru Perfume Corporation. After the success with a pomade called the Tancho Stick in 1933, Kintsuru Perfume Corp. began to focus its future efforts in men's care. By 1959, the success of the Tancho Stick led the company to change its name to Tancho Corporation.

Tancho's efforts with expanding outside Japan was further boosted in 1970, when the company launched a new line of men's care products, called Mandom, which took its name from a combination of the words "human" and "Freedom". An advertising campaign featuring Charles Bronson became the first of a long series of Japanese ads to feature top Hollywood stars. Within weeks of airing the commercial, Mandom become the No.1 selling male toiletry brand in Japan. Tancho then changed its name again, to Mandom Corporation, in 1971.

In 1976, Mandom's success and the creation of their flagship brand, Gatsby, encouraged them to move into direct sales of their products. However, despite the success of the Gatsby brand, the move was disastrous; by 1980, the firm gave up the direct sales model and returned to wholesale distribution.

Mandom went public in 1988, selling shares on the Tokyo Stock Exchange's over-the-counter market. In 1989, the firm introduced Lucido-l, a new cosmetic line for women. Into the early 2000s, the firm expanded its international presence by establishing the Gatsby and Lucido-l brands as its flagship global brands.

Marketing Brands
Flagship brands:
 GATSBY: grooming products for young men.  Sales of Gatsby products accounted for 59.6% of the company's revenue in 2012.
 LUCIDO: grooming products for middle-aged men.
 Lucido-l: beauty care products for women.
 Bifesta: cosmetics brand for women.
 Pixy: cosmetic brand for women.
 Pucelle: fragrance and body care brand for women.

Other brands: Dr. Renaud, Guinot brand, Formulate, Aristia, and Direction Refilia, Miratone, and Johnny Andrean.

Brand Ambassadors 
 Samuel Zylgwyn (Gatsby)
 Marisha Chacha (Pixy)
 Citra Kirana (Pixy)
 Angelina Sondakh
 Agatha Christie
 Acha Septriasa (Pixy)
 Charles Bronson (Mandom)

References

External links

  

Chemical companies of Japan
Cosmetics companies of Japan
Companies listed on the Tokyo Stock Exchange
Chemical companies established in 1927
Japanese companies established in 1927
Japanese brands
Cosmetics brands
Manufacturing companies based in Osaka
Personal care companies
2002 initial public offerings